Xyloskenea rhyssa is a species of sea snail, a marine gastropod mollusk, unassigned in the superfamily Seguenzioidea.

References

 Dall W. H. (1927). Small shells from dredgings off the southeast coast of the United states by the United States Fisheries Steamer "Albatross", in 1885 and 1886. Proceedings of the United States National Museum, 70(18): 1-134

External links
 To World Register of Marine Species

rhyssa
Gastropods described in 1927